Mount Nelson is a suburb of the city of Hobart, Tasmania, Australia above the Hobart suburb of Sandy Bay and to the south of Hobart's CBD. Because of its views over the River Derwent (Tasmania), it is one of the more prestigious suburbs in Hobart.

The main road in Mount Nelson is Nelson Road, which extends up the mountain from the Wrest Point Hotel Casino into the Sandy Bay suburb. It is known for its "bends", which consist of seven very sharp corners created as the road winds its way up the mountain. Nelson Road was constructed in 1908 to provide better access to the Mount Nelson signal station.

History
Mount Nelson was originally named 'Nelson's Hill' by Captain William Bligh (of Mutiny on the Bounty fame) in 1792 in honour of David Nelson, the botanist of the Bounty mission, as "he was the first white man on it" when the Bounty visited 'Van Diemens Land' on its way to Tahiti. Nelson was one of the Bounty crew who was loyal to Bligh during the mutiny. He died at Kupang in Timor on 20 July 1789 of an 'inflammatory fever' caused by the long open-boat voyage following the mutiny. His funeral was attended by the Governor and officers from every ship in the harbour. The name 'Nelson's Hill' was later changed to Mount Nelson.

When Governor Lachlan Macquarie visited Van Diemen's Land in 1811, he directed that a signal post be established on the summit of Mount Nelson to announce the appearance of all ships entering the estuary.  The semaphore technology of the signal station was superseded when Tasmania's first telephone line was established between the Mount Nelson signal station and the Hobart telegraph office in 1880.

Most of the modern suburban development in Mount Nelson has taken place after 1945 when the government encouraged settlement of immigrants escaping the destruction that took place in Europe after World War II.  During this same period the section of hillface north of the bends on Nelson Road, which used to be a firing range, was converted into university farm land for the University of Tasmania.

A Rialannah Post Office opened on 1 April 1948 and was renamed Mount Nelson in 1956. It closed in 1971.

In 1967 a large number of houses were destroyed by the Black Tuesday Bushfires.

Features and services

Educational institutions 
Hobart College, one of Hobart's four public secondary colleges, is located on the mountain. Mary, Crown Princess of Denmark, wife of Frederik, Crown Prince of Denmark, is a graduate of Hobart College.

Mt Nelson is home to Mt Nelson Primary School. The school has approximately 200 students from Kinder – Grade 6. The school is a feeder to Taroona High School and encompasses Mt Nelson and Tolmans Hill.

Swift parrot
Mount Nelson is one of the breeding grounds for the endangered Swift parrot. It is thought that there are only around 1000 breeding pairs in existence.

Recreation and sites
Several bushland tracks (e.g. the Historical Truganini walking track) weave through the surrounding area. The Skyline Reserve also includes a collection of walking tracks. The Signal Station remains one of the areas main man-made attractions.

References

External links
Mount Nelson Page

Localities of City of Hobart
Localities of Kingborough Council
Towns in Tasmania